Maximilian Thalhammer (born 10 July 1997) is a German professional footballer who plays as a midfielder for Jahn Regensburg. He previously played for SC Paderborn 07,SSV Jahn Regensburg and FC Ingolstadt 04.

References

External links
 

1997 births
Living people
People from Freising
Sportspeople from Upper Bavaria
Footballers from Bavaria
German footballers
Germany youth international footballers
Association football midfielders
FC Ingolstadt 04 players
SSV Jahn Regensburg players
FC Ingolstadt 04 II players
SC Paderborn 07 players
2. Bundesliga players
3. Liga players
Regionalliga players